M102 may refer to:

 Messier 102, an object listed in the Messier Catalogue that remains unidentified
 M102 howitzer, an American light-towed 105 mm howitzer 
 Mercedes-Benz M102 engine, an automobile engine developed by Mercedes-Benz
 BMW M102, a BMW piston engine
 M-102 (Michigan highway), a highway in Michigan along 8 Mile Road
 M102 (New York City bus), a bus route in Manhattan